Warner Independent Pictures was an independent film division of the American film studio Warner Bros., itself a division of  Warner Bros. Discovery, which then was known as TimeWarner. Established on August 7, 2003, its first release was 2004's Before Sunset, the sequel to the 1995 film Before Sunrise. The division financed, produced, acquired and distributed feature films largely budgeted under $20 million.

Mark Gill was the division's first president. After a controversial departure, Gill was replaced by former Warner Bros. production executive Polly Cohen, who served as president of this division until fall 2008, when the division was officially shut down. While well versed in big-budget motion picture production, it was widely believed Cohen did not have strong enough backgrounds in independent film, or in the marketing/publicity aspects of film distribution, to hold that role. This led to a lackluster slate and output, after a successful initial run under Gill.

In February 2008, Time Warner announced that it would merge New Line Cinema into Warner Bros. New Line's "independent" group Picturehouse was expected to be merged into Warner Independent as part of this process. On May 8, 2008, however, it was announced that both of these specialty divisions would be shut down. In 2013 however, Picturehouse was relaunched under separate ownership.

Films

References

External links
 

 
Defunct film and television production companies of the United States
American companies established in 2003
Mass media companies established in 2003
Mass media companies disestablished in 2008
Warner Bros. divisions
Film production companies of the United States
American independent film studios